Evgeny Donskoy was the defending champion, but chose not to compete.
Number 1 seed Dudi Sela overcame Mikhail Kukushkin 5–7, 6–2, 7–6(8–6).

Seeds

Main draw

Finals

Top half

Bottom half

References 
 Main draw
 Qualifying draw

President's Cup - Men's Singles
2013 Men's Singles